Young-Kee Kim is a South Korea-born American physicist and Louis Block Distinguished Service Professor of Physics at the University of Chicago. She is Chair of the Department of Physics at the university.

Education
Young-Kee Kim was born and raised in South Korea.

1984 B.S. Physics, Korea University
1986 M.S. Physics, Korea University
1990 Ph.D. Physics, University of Rochester

Career
As an experimental particle physicist, she has devoted much of her research work to understanding the origin of mass for fundamental particles by studying the W boson and the top quark, two of the most massive elementary particles, at the Tevatron’s CDF experiment, and by studying the Higgs boson that gives mass to elementary particles at the LHC’s ATLAS experiment. She also works on accelerator science, playing a leadership role in NSF's Science and Technology Center, the Center for Bright Beams. She was co-Spokesperson of the CDF collaboration between 2004 and 2006 and Deputy Director of Fermilab between 2006 and 2013.

She is a Fellow of the American Academy of Arts and Sciences (2017), the American Association for the Advancement of Science (2012), the American Physical Society (2004) and an Alfred P. Sloan fellow (1997). She received the Ho-Am Prize (2005), the Korea University Alumni Award (2012) and the Rochester Distinguished Scholar Medal (2010).
She was elected a member of the National Academy of Sciences in 2022.

Work
Young-Kee Kim is an experimental particle physics. She has devoted much of her research work to understanding the origin of mass for fundamental particles by studying the W boson and the top quark, two of the most massive elementary particles, at the Tevatron’s CDF experiment, and by studying the Higgs boson that gives mass to elementary particles at the LHC’s ATLAS experiment.

1990 – 1995: Postdoc Fellow / Research Scientist, Lawrence Berkeley National Laboratory
1996 – 2000: Assistant Prof. of Physics, University of California, Berkeley
2000 – 2001: Associate Prof. of Physics, University of California, Berkeley
2002: Professor of Physics, University of California, Berkeley
2003 – Present: Professor of Physics, University of Chicago
2006 – 2013: Deputy Director, Fermilab
2016 – Present: Chair, the Department of Physics, University of Chicago
2017 – Present: Louis Block Distinguished Service Professor of Physics, University of Chicago

Awards
1987: Rush Rhees Fellow
1997: Alfred P. Sloan Fellow
2004: Fellow of the American Physical Society
2005: Ho-Am Prize
2010: Rochester Distinguished Scholar Medal
2012: Fellow of the American Association for the Advancement of Science
2012: Korea University Alumni Award 
2012: Leadership Award, Women in Science, Chicago Council of Science and Technology 
2017: Fellow of the American Academy of Arts and Sciences

Research positions
1993 – 1999: Leader, CDF W Mass Analysis Group
1995 – 1996: Co-Leader, CDF Electroweak Physics Group
2000: Associate Project Manager, CDF Run II Upgrade
2001: Associate Head, CDF Run II Detector Operations
2002: Co-Leader, CDF Level-3 Trigger System
2003 – 2004: Co-Leader, CDF Top Mass Analysis Group
2004 – 2006: Co-Spokesperson, CDF Collaboration at the Tevatron proton-antiproton collider at Fermilab

References

External links 

 Oral history interview transcript for Young-Kee Kim on 5 January 2021, American Institute of Physics, Niels Bohr Library and Archives

1962 births
Living people
21st-century American physicists
South Korean emigrants to the United States
Korea University alumni
University of Rochester alumni
Recipients of the Ho-Am Prize in Science
Fellows of the American Academy of Arts and Sciences
Fellows of the American Association for the Advancement of Science
Fellows of the American Physical Society
People associated with Fermilab
Members of the United States National Academy of Sciences